Simon John Lowe (born 26 December 1962) is an English former professional footballer who played as a forward in the Football League.

Career
Born in Westminster, London Lowe made appearances for Football League clubs Barnsley, Halifax Town, Hartlepool United, Colchester United and Scarborough. 

He now lives in Wakefield.

References

External links
Simon Lowe at Neil Brown's

1962 births
Living people
Footballers from Westminster
English footballers
Association football forwards
York City F.C. players
Ossett Town F.C. players
Barnsley F.C. players
Halifax Town A.F.C. players
Hartlepool United F.C. players
Colchester United F.C. players
Scarborough F.C. players
Goole Town F.C. players
Frickley Athletic F.C. players
Glasshoughton Welfare A.F.C. players
Pontefract Collieries F.C. players
Ossett Albion A.F.C. players
English Football League players